Michael Corder (born 17 March 1955) is a British choreographer and director.

Corder trained at the Royal Ballet School and joined the Royal Ballet itself in 1973.

References

British choreographers
British male ballet dancers
1955 births
Place of birth missing (living people)
Living people
20th-century British ballet dancers
21st-century British ballet dancers